USS Tang (SSN-805) will be a nuclear-powered, -class attack submarine in the United States Navy. She will also be third United States Navy vessel with the name tang, a large family of tropical fish. Secretary of the Navy Kenneth Braithwaite announced in a 17 November 2020 press release that the submarine will be named USS Tang, in honor of a storied WWII submarine. This is the second of four new classmates named in honor of WWII submarines with very successful combat records. Ordered on 2 December 2019, she is the fourth of the Block V boats, the first boats of the class to include the Virginia Payload Module.

References

Virginia-class submarines
Submarines of the United States Navy
Proposed ships of the United States Navy